The 1872 West Cheshire by-election was contested on 17 February 1872 due to the resignation of the incumbent Conservative MP, John Tollemache.  It was won by the unopposed Conservative candidate Wilbraham Tollemache.

References

1872 elections in the United Kingdom
1872 in England
19th century in Cheshire
By-elections to the Parliament of the United Kingdom in Cheshire constituencies
Unopposed by-elections to the Parliament of the United Kingdom in English constituencies